Soundelux is an American audio post production company based in California, a previous member of the Todd Soundelux group of sound companies. The Soundelux library and trademark was bought in 2014 by Sounddogs. In 2021, original founders Bender and Stateman came together to launch the new Soundelux, which restarted in sound editing production with episodes of HBO's Euphoria.

The post production company provides audio services to clients working in feature films and television. Soundelux supervising sound editors, sound designers, and sound editors earned nominations and honors from the Academy Awards, Emmy Awards, BAFTAs and Golden Reel Awards.

History
Lon Bender and Wylie Stateman founded Soundelux in 1982, focused on audio post production for the feature film industry.  In 1991 they partnered with John Miceli, Tony Miceli and David Kneupper to create the Soundelux Entertainment Group and to expand their business on the east coast and into the growing special venue industry.  In 1992, Scott Martin Gershin partnered with Wylie Stateman & Lon Bender to create Soundelux Media Labs, which eventually would become Soundelux Design Music Group (DMG), created to supply Sound design, voice over casting, and music composition to the interactive entertainment industry. Together they all continued developing additional business units, such as Showorks Entertainment, Modern Music, Soundelux DMG, The Hollywood Edge, MTS Cinema Services, and Soundelux Microphones, adding partners Kim Waugh, Per Hallberg, and Ken Statemen.

In November 1995, Jeffrey Edell, the Business Management partner at Duitch and Franklin for Lon Bender and Wylie Stateman and Soundelux, joined them as CEO and helped integrate 13 separate companies into one consolidated group called Soundelux Entertainment Group. During his tenure and until the sale to John Malone's Liberty Media Group, the company grew to over $120M in revenue, with almost 500 employees at its peak.

On June 9, 2000, Liberty Media Group acquired the post production and sound business of Soundelux Entertainment Group for $90M cash, a deal that replaced one agreed to in July 1999 for stock then valued at $200M. The purchase excluded Soundelux Showorks & Soundelux Florida, the company's location-based entertainment and theater design businesses. These businesses were debt free at the close of the acquisition and positioned for long term growth in an emerging industry. Tony Miceli departed in 2000 to explore new opportunities.

In 2001, John Miceli broke off of the remaining Soundlelux Media Group company and formed Technomedia to build on the immersive media experience business that was emerging.

The remaining business unit continued under the direction of Jeff Edell, who assigned Phil Rafnson the direction of Soundelux Showorks, Soundelux Florida group until its bankruptcy filing in 2002.

In the same year, Liberty Media Group rebranded itself as Ascent Media Group. The move was made to raise the company's profile in Hollywood. At the same time, the company was split into three divisions: Ascent Media Creative Services, Ascent Media Network Services and Ascent Media Management Services. Soundelux is part of the Creative Services division, along with Todd-AO, Riot, Company 3, Method, Encore, Level 3 and POP.

In October 2008, the Creative Sound Services group broke away from Ascent Media Group and the Discovery Holding Company to create CSS Studios, LLC, a wholly owned subsidiary of Discovery Communications.  The services of CSS Studios are marketed under the brand names Soundelux, Todd-AO,Sound One, POP Sound, Modern Music, Soundelux Design Music Group, and The Hollywood Edge.  CSS Studios maintain facilities in Los Angeles and New York.

On September 19, 2012, Empire Investment Holdings announced it had acquired CSS Studios, LLC.

In January 2013, CSS Studios announced it would rename the company as TODD-SOUNDELUX.

On May 21, 2014, Todd-Soundelux Filed for Chapter 11 Bankruptcy Protection.

On November 17, 2014, the Todd-Soundelux Trademarks (Todd AO and Soundelux) and Copyrights (Sound Effects Library) were acquired in Federal Bankruptcy Court (Central District Case No. 2:14-bk-19980) by Rob Nokes of Sounddogs.com, Inc.

Relaunch
In 2021, original founders Bender and Stateman came together to relaunch the new Soundelux, which restarted in sound editing production with episodes of HBO's Euphoria. According to Lon and Wylie, the website will be polished over the next few weeks and the new company will build on the legacy that Soundelux has crafted from sound professionals who created the legacy of excellence Soundelux is known for around the world.

Services
Soundelux offers sound supervision, sound design and sound editing for feature films. The company also boasts a library of unique sound effects that includes 400,000 original tracks. They also offered a microphone division, launched by David Bock, former audio engineer, in 1995. The microphones were modern but with the look and sound of vintage models.

Overseas
Until 2010, Soundelux operated a facility in London. Much like its U.S.-based operations, Soundelux London had a sound design and editing facility. Eddy Joseph, the facility's leading creative force, has been nominated for multiple BAFTA and MPSE Awards. His work on the 2008 James Bond film Quantum of Solace earned him an Academy Award nomination. In 2009, Joseph was awarded Best UK Film Sound Editor/Designer at the UK Screen Sound Awards.

Notable staff
 Wylie Stateman
 Lon E. Bender
 John Miceli
 Karen Baker Landers
 Scott Martin Gershin
Peter Michael Sulliven 
 Tony Miceli
 Mark Stoeckinger
 Dave McMoyler
 Andrew DeCristofaro
 Becky Sullivan
 Tom Bellfort
 Alan Rankin

Partial filmography

1990s

Home Alone (1990)
JFK (1991)
Home Alone 2: Lost in New York (1992)
Mrs. Doubtfire (1993)
The Crow (1994)
Natural Born Killers (1994)
The Pagemaster (1994)
Braveheart (1995)
Pocahontas (1995)
The Hunchback of Notre Dame (1996)
Godzilla (1998)
Mulan (1998)
Tarzan (1999)
Inspector Gadget (1999)

2010s
Pacific Rim (2013)

Industry recognition
The audio professionals working out of Soundelux have earned hundreds of notable industry nominations and awards. Here are some highlights:

Soundelux Design Music Group

Soundelux Design Music Group (DMG) was established in 1985 by Stateman, Bender and Scott Martin Gershin and is still headed up by Gershin. The company specializes in sound for video games, commercials, new media, and experience-based environments.

References

External links
 Soundelux Credits at IMDb
 Soundelux
 Soundelux at LinkedIn
 Soundelux DMG archived website

Film sound production
Recording studios in California
1982 establishments in California
2014 disestablishments in California